The handsome flycatcher (Nephelomyias pulcher) is a species of bird in the family Tyrannidae. It is found in Bolivia, Colombia, Ecuador, and Peru. Its natural habitat is subtropical or tropical moist montane forests.

References

handsome flycatcher
Birds of the Northern Andes
handsome flycatcher
handsome flycatcher
Taxonomy articles created by Polbot